is a railway station on the Karatsu Line operated by JR Kyushu located in Taku, Saga Prefecture, Japan.

Lines

Station layout 
The station consists of a side platform serving a single track. A simple prefabricated station building is unstaffed and houses a waiting room and an automatic ticket vending machine. A bike shed is located nearby.

Adjacent stations

History 
Japanese National Railways (JNR) opened the station on 1 April 1964 as an additional station on the existing track of the Karatsu Line. With the privatization of JNR on 1 April 1987, control of the station passed to JR Kyushu.

Passenger statistics
In fiscal 2016, the station was used by an average of 465 passengers daily (boarding passengers only), and it ranked 251st among the busiest stations of JR Kyushu.

Surrounding area
Taku City Junior High School
Naka-Taku Hospital
Saga Women's College Hishinomi Kindergarten
Taku City Hall
Taku City Library
Taku Post office
Taku City Chūō Junior High School
Saga Prefectural Taku High School

References

External links
Naga-Taku Station (JR Kyushu)

Railway stations in Saga Prefecture
Stations of Kyushu Railway Company
Karatsu Line
Railway stations in Japan opened in 1964